Fratton Park is a football ground in Portsmouth, England and is the home of Portsmouth F.C.. Fratton Park's location on Portsea Island is unique in English professional football, as it is the only professional English football ground not found on the mainland of Great Britain. Fratton Park has been the only home football ground in Portsmouth FC's entire history.

The early Fratton Park was designed by local architect Arthur Cogswell and built in 1899 on the site of a market garden in Milton, a Portsea Island farming village. In 1904, the village of Milton and the entirety of Portsea Island became part of the borough of Portsmouth.

Portsmouth's football ground was deceptively named as "Fratton Park" by the club's founders, to persuade supporters that the new Milton-based football ground was within walking distance of neighbouring Fratton's railway station; the true distance between the railway station and football ground is actually one mile, or a ten-minute walk.

Fratton Park was first opened to the public on Tuesday 15 August 1899. The first ever match at Fratton Park took place on the afternoon of Wednesday 6 September 1899, a 2-0 friendly win against Southampton FC, attended by 4,141 supporters. Three days later, the first competitive home match at Fratton Park was played on Saturday 9 September 1899, a Southern League First Division 2–0 win against Reading F.C., attended by 9,000 supporters.

Sir John Brickwood (1852–1932) was Portsmouth's founding chairman. Brickwood, owner of a Portsmouth-based brewery, was also a philanthropist. In 1900, the Brickwood Brewery opened a mock-Tudor public house named The Pompey in Frogmore Road next to Fratton Park. In 1905, a mock-Tudor club pavilion was donated by Sir John Brickwood and built to the north of The Pompey pub. The pavilion, which originally had an octagonal clock tower spire on its roof, contained club offices and players changing rooms. The pavilion and The Pompey pub were both designed by Fratton Park's original architect, Arthur Cogswell.

Fratton Park's maximum capacity reached a potential for 58,000 supporters in 1935 after the North Stand and North Terrace were rebuilt, but was reduced to 52,000 for safety reasons after the Burnden Park disaster of 1946. The highest recorded attendance in Fratton Park's history was in Portsmouth's first Division One championship winning season of 1948–49 with a crowd recorded at 51,385 on 26 February 1949, for an FA Cup Sixth Round match vs Derby County, a match which if Portsmouth had won, could have led to them achieving the rare Double of winning both the FA Cup and Division One championship titles in the same season.

On 26 July 1948, Fratton Park hosted a Netherlands vs Ireland first-round football game in the 1948 London Olympics, one of only two grounds outside London to host matches in the Olympic football tournament.  The game at Fratton Park was attended by a crowd of 8,000, with a 3–1 win to the Netherlands.

On 22 February 1956, Fratton Park became the first English football ground to stage an evening Football League match under artificial light, against Newcastle United. The original floodlights, positioned at opposite ends on top of Fratton Park's South Stand and North Stand roofs, were replaced in 1962 by floodlight tower pylons in the four corners of the ground.

Fratton Park's four corner floodlight towers, erected in 1962, became well known in Portsmouth - and also acted as a useful landmark for visiting away supporters. Since 2015, the four towers were gradually replaced by modern roof-level lights. One surviving floodlight tower - from the north-west corner - was renovated and relocated to Fratton Park's main car park on 15 July 2019 for preservation, albeit without its lighting lamps which were not required and removed. The preserved floodlight tower now also acts as a telecommunications antenna tower.

Fratton Park was used as part of the 70-day long London 2012 Olympic Torch Relay route. The Day 59 relay route began on 16 July 2012, with Portsmouth F.C. steward and D-Day veteran John Jenkins as runner number 001, carrying the Olympic flame onto Fratton Park pitch. The Day 59 torch relay route then set off from Fratton Park, through Portsmouth and eastwards to Brighton & Hove.

Fratton Park is affectionately nicknamed "The Old Girl" by Portsmouth supporters, and has a reputation for high attendances and a powerful atmosphere, similar to that of larger capacity stadia. Since the introduction of all-seated stadia policy in 1996, Fratton Park's maximum capacity has been reduced to 20,899.

Layout

Description

Fratton Park is built in a traditional English style with four separate stands of varied designs and sizes and arranged closely around the four sides of the football pitch. The pitch measures 115 x 73 yards, and is aligned from east to west, which is considered unusual in English football, as most other pitches are orientated north to south to maximise natural sunlight.

The stadium has a capacity for 20,899 supporters, although it has had a much larger maximum capacity for 58,000 supporters after the construction of the North Stand in 1935. Fratton Park's record attendance is 51,385, reached in an FA Cup quarter-final match vs Derby County, on 26 February 1949, in which Portsmouth won 2–1.

The four stands in Fratton Park are named The North Stand (north), The South Stand (south), The Milton End (east) and The Fratton End (west). Before the reconstruction of the 4,500 seat Fratton End in 1997, the previously unseated terraced stands of the old Fratton End, Lower North Terrace and Milton End were conjoined as one contiguous terrace for much of Fratton Park's twentieth century history.

Along the northern touchline of the pitch is the two-tier North Stand, the largest stand in Fratton Park. The North Stand (including Lower North Terrace) was rebuilt and reopened as a full standing stand on 7 September 1935, increasing Fratton Park's maximum capacity to 58,000 supporters. However, the stadium capacity was reduced to 52,000 for safety reasons after the Burnden Park disaster of 1946 and 4,226 seats were fitted to the upper North Stand terracing in 1951. The lower North Terrace was also fitted with seats in 1996.  A new roof extension, supported by steel columns, was added from the front of the North Stand in 1997 and extended over the North Terrace (previously uncovered) to the pitch touchline. The North Stand turnstiles are accessed from Milton Lane. A gravel surfaced car park is a recent addition to the rear of the North Stand. The current 'Pompey Shop' merchandise shop and ticket office are located directly behind the North Stand car park in Anson Road.

The current South Stand has two tiers and was opened on 29 August 1925 and is currently the oldest stand in Fratton Park. It replaced an earlier and smaller South Stand (known as The Grand Stand) that existed on the site between 1899 and 1925.  The current 1925 South Stand was designed by the famed Scottish architect Archibald Leitch. The entrance to the South Stand is in Frogmore Road and is notable for its mock Tudor façade, which is a remnant of a grand mock Tudor pavilion structure - with a clock tower - that previously occupied the site from 1905 before the current South Stand was built in 1925.

At the eastern end of Fratton Park is the Milton End, the smallest stand. The original Milton End was built in 1905 and was known as the Spion Kop, and was enlarged to its current size in 1949. Infamously, the Milton End was the only roofless stand in the Premier League, before a roof was added before the 2007–08 season. The Milton End is used by visiting 'away' supporters, with turnstiles in an alleyway named Specks Lane, directly behind the Milton End.

At the western end of Fratton Park is the single tier 4,500 seat Fratton End, which first opened on 31 October 1997 and is the newest and tallest stand in Fratton Park. The Fratton End also had an official opening ceremony on 4 April 1998, timed to coincide with a home match that was one day before the centennial anniversary of Portsmouth F.C. on 5 April 1998.  The current Fratton End replaced an earlier two-tier Fratton End built in 1956, which had its upper tier demolished in 1986 for structural reasons. The remaining lower tier of the Fratton End was demolished eleven seasons later in 1997 to clear the land for the building of the current Fratton End stand in 1997. The Fratton End turnstiles are accessed from Frogmore Road.

Fratton Park name and location
Despite its Fratton Park name, Portsmouth's football ground is not located in the Fratton area of Portsmouth, instead it was built in Milton in 1899. Fratton Park is actually named after the nearby Fratton railway station (which is in Fratton) and not the geographic area of Fratton of Portsmouth.  This peculiar misnaming has caused many of Portsmouth's residents and football fans to incorrectly assume that Fratton Park is located in Fratton, and not in Milton.

Fratton Park was built in 1899 on a plot of agricultural land in Milton, a small rural village on the east side of Portsea Island. The plot of land was originally a market garden to the north of Goldsmith Avenue and was purchased by Portsmouth FC from the Goldsmith farming family in the autumn of 1898. At the time, the late nineteenth century village of Milton still retained a remote, rural and isolated feeling from the busy town of Portsmouth, and had no railway station of its own, the nearest being located one mile to the west in Fratton, in the centre of Portsea Island.

Fratton railway station - in a nineteenth century Victorian era before mass car ownership - was seen as key to attracting supporters to the early Portsmouth FC football ground in rural Milton. It was decided by the club directors that the "Fratton" part of the Fratton railway station name was to be used for the naming of the football ground, to deliberately understate the actual one mile travel distance from Fratton railway station to the newly built "Fratton Park" football ground - in Milton.

The boundaries of Portsmouth were changed in 1904 to include the entirety of Portsea Island, thus making Milton and Portsea Island's other towns and villages all part of the town borough of Portsmouth. Portsmouth would later expand onto the mainland and achieve city status in 1926.

Ironically, on 28 May 1912, Portsmouth's town council bought the remaining Milton Farm land from the Goldsmith farming family, and on 11 July 1923 the council opened a public recreation park named Milton Park in Milton, only 127 metres to the east of Fratton Park on Priory Crescent.

The east stand of Fratton Park is named the Milton End, an acknowledgement to the actual village of Milton that the football ground was built in.

The former nineteenth century villages of Milton and Fratton are now residential areas of the present-day city of Portsmouth, the physical boundaries of the two former villages are now blurred by the modern-day urban sprawl of the city of Portsmouth. However, Milton and Fratton still have defined official boundaries; Milton and Fratton are physically separated by the Portsmouth Direct line railway line, they have separate political voting wards and also have distinctively different postal codes.

If Fratton Park had hypothetically been built in the Fratton area of Portsmouth, its postal code would begin with PO1 5**. However, Fratton Park retains a PO4 8RA Milton postcode and not the PO1 area postal code of Fratton and Portsmouth's city centre.

By coincidence, Fratton Park's PO4 8RA postal code contains the RA abbreviation of the late nineteenth century precursor Royal Artillery Portsmouth FC, sometimes known as RA Portsmouth.

Transport Links
Fratton Park is closest to Fratton railway station, roughly one mile to the west of the ground (about ten minutes' walk away). Fratton railway station is located on the Portsmouth Direct Line branch, which links to both London Waterloo station and London Victoria station. Services from Southampton, Bournemouth, Bristol, Cardiff and Brighton also stop at Fratton railway station.

By road, Fratton Park is close to the A2030 on the east coast of Portsea Island, and is named Velder Avenue at its southern end, and Eastern Road to its north. At the north Eastern Road end of the A2030, it intersects with the main A27 south coast trunk road at Farlington, Portsmouth. This A27 intersection has the M27 motorway to its west, and A27 to the east. Further to the east, the A27 links to the A3(M) to London and the M25 motorway which orbits London.

By sea, Portsmouth International Port has passenger ferry routes to the Channel Islands, northern France, and northern Spain. From Portsmouth Harbour railway station, there are foot passenger ferries to Gosport and the Isle of Wight. A car ferry service to the Isle of Wight also operates from nearby Gunwharf.

Fratton Park history 
On 5 April 1898, Portsmouth Football Club was founded by a group of six local businessmen and sports enthusiasts at the office of Alderman John Edward Pink (a law solicitor) at number 12 High Street, Old Portsmouth. The men formed a syndicate to share their resources to form a professional football club and to buy a plot of land near Goldsmith Avenue, Milton to build a football ground. "The Portsmouth Football and Athletic Company" as it was originally known, had a capital of £8,000 amongst its chairman and five directors.:

 John Brickwood - the owner of Portsmouth-based 'Brickwoods Brewery' and first chairman of Portsmouth F.C. (John Brickwood was knighted in 1904, became First Baronet Brickwood of Portsmouth in 1927)
 Major Alfred H. Bone - a surveyor and architect.
 John Peters  - a wine importer.
 William Wigginton - a government contractor and former Royal Engineers Warrant Officer.
 George Lewin Oliver - founder and headmaster of Mile End School, a boys preparatory school located at 384-388 Old Commercial Road, Mile End, Portsmouth, which locally became known as 'Oliver's Academy'.
 Alderman John Edward Pink - a solicitor, based at 12 High Street, Old Portsmouth, employed by John Brickwood. John Pink was mayor of Portsmouth in 1904 and 1905.

A blue plaque on the wall of 12 High Street, Old Portsmouth (Alderman John E. Pink's office building) commemorates the founding on 5 April 1898.

Their prospectus, dated 14 May 1898, revealed that they proposed to "acquire a piece of land in Goldsmith Avenue up to £1100 an acre" in Milton, to be used primarily for football and "for such outdoor games and exercises that were approved by the directors." These were to include cycling, athletics and cricket matches. It was noted that the ground was to be built within convenient reach of Fratton railway station, and that it "was intended to drain and turf the land and erect the necessary buildings" for a further £2,000, which would leave working capital of about £1,000. It was hoped that football in Portsmouth would become as popular as it had become in northern England towns, where attendances were between 20,000 and 30,000. The existing team at Southampton was mentioned as well as an embryonic club at Brighton and it was hoped that "a healthy rivalry would spring up that would increase the popularity and income of the company".

 
With the successful acquisition of a four-and-a-half acre plot of market garden land, bought from the Goldsmith family who owned Milton Farm (and from whom which 'Goldsmith Avenue' is named after), a general meeting of shareholders was then held on 2 September 1898 at the Sussex Hotel in Landport, Portsmouth. The Sussex Hotel was actually a large Brickwoods Brewery hostelry which stood directly opposite the Portsmouth Town Hall (it was demolished in 1972 when the present Guildhall Square was built).

Weeks later, prominent Football Association representative William Pickford met with Portsmouth director George Lewin Oliver and inspected their plot of land which would soon become a new football ground. The site was shortly to be turfed and fenced and it was hoped that football matches could be played there after Christmas of 1898. However, the land was still covered with a crop of potatoes which the directors were "anxious to sell", which they eventually did, adding to the funds of the newly formed company.
 
On 19 December 1898, the "Hampshire Telegraph" newspaper ran an advertisement inviting tenders "for the building of two stands: the first, 100 feet long with seven rows of seats on the south side and the second, terracing which stretched for 240 feet on the opposite, north side". The south side "Grand Stand" would be built in 1899 by local architect Arthur Cogswell.

Eight months later, on 15 August 1899, more than 1,000 people, including some of the first Pompey players, attended the official opening day to see how the former Milton Farm potato field had been transformed into a modest football ground. The name of the new ground was revealed to be "Fratton Park", and was named after Fratton railway station. It is almost certain that the naming of Fratton Park, which is actually located in Milton, not Fratton, was a slightly dishonest tactic of the early football club, to persuade potential new supporters that the new football ground was within an easy walking distance of an established railway station and tram connections. Fratton Park is actually a one-mile walk east of Fratton railway station and Fratton itself.

Frank Brettell was the club's first team manager. The club was elected directly into the First Division of the Southern League in 1899, with their first league match being played away at Chatham Town on 2 September 1899 (a 1–0 victory), followed three days later by the first match at Fratton Park.

The first ever match at Fratton Park was a "friendly" against Southampton FC, and was played on the late afternoon of Wednesday 6 September 1899, with goals from Dan Cunliffe (formerly with Liverpool) and Harold Clarke (formerly with Everton). The game was won by Portsmouth 2-0 and the first Fratton Park attendance was 4,141 with gate receipts of 141 pounds, 14 shillings and 9 pence (approximately £17,000 when adjusted to 2018 inflation).

Today, some Portsmouth fans erroneously believe that Fratton Park is in Portsmouth's Fratton area, literally because of the stadium's name and also lacking the correct facts of Milton's long history. A political map of Portsmouth clearly defines the border between the Fratton and Milton areas with a line drawn from Fratton Bridge, along the Portsmouth Direct line railway up to St. Mary's Bridge. Fratton is located north of the line with Milton to the south. Fratton Park is south of the railway line, and thus is in Milton. This fact can also be proven further as Fratton Park has a Milton-based PO4 8RA postal code address (Fratton and Portsmouth city centre has a "PO1" postal code). A further fact is that Fratton Park lies within the Milton Ward electoral district for Portsmouth City Council and national level parliamentary elections.

Fratton Park Stands

The South Stand

Current capacity: 4,856 (all seated)

Fratton Park's first South Stand, called The Grand Stand, was built in 1899 by Portsmouth-based architect Arthur Cogswell measuring "100 feet long with seven rows of seats on the south side" and was built on the southern side of the pitch. The admittance price to sit within the Grand Stand in 1899 cost two shillings, or ' two-bob '. The Fratton Park pitch was surrounded by hooped metal fence railings.

A strong wind blew off the roof of the South Stand in 1901. The roof was rebuilt for a then £120 (approx £14,000 in 2018), but the new roof would only last until March 1916 - when it was blown off again!

On the early evening of 16 March 1916, the entire roof of the South Stand was blown off again by "a great hurricane". Houses surrounding Fratton Park in Carisbrooke Road and Ruskin Avenue were hit by the South Stand roof and suffered extensive damage.

In 1925, because of overcrowding of the original "one-thousand" seat Grand Stand and revenue lost to "better class supporters unable to obtain a seat", work on a new and larger South Stand began on 17 June 1925 and was completed just ten weeks later at a cost of £20,000 (approximately £1.1 million in 2018). The new South Stand was designed by renowned football architect Archibald Leitch. and was opened by the then Football League President, John McKenna on 29 August 1925, just before the kickoff before a home match against Middlesbrough. Leitch's South Stand was built with an all wooden upper section with flip-turn seats in the central section, with wooden benches at the west and eastern ends. A lower terrace 'paddock' standing section below pitch level was also built. The South Stand also featured new players dressing rooms previously located in the Fratton Park pavilion. A "tunnel" built directly from within the South Stand dressing rooms lead to the pitch at the halfway line point. As the new South Stand was much larger than the original, the Fratton Park pitch was reduced in width from 77 to 73 yards.

Because of the new South Stand, most of the eastern side of Arthur Cogwell's original mock Tudor pavilion, including its clock tower and spectator gallery were removed or absorbed into the new South Stand's footprint.  The now famous mock Tudor "Main Entrance" to Fratton Park in Frogmore Road is now all that remains visible of the exterior of the original pavilion today.

Floodlights were fitted to the roof ends of both the South Stand and North Stand in 1956.  On 22 February 1956, Fratton Park played host to the very first Football League First Division match under floodlights, in which Newcastle United defeated Portsmouth 0–2. These floodlights became obsolete by the 1960s and were replaced by four pylon tower floodlights built in the four corners of Fratton Park in 1962.

During 1983, when pitch invasions by supporters were commonplace, perimeter fences were built around the entire Fratton Park pitch.

Following the 11 May 1985 Bradford City stadium fire, safety upgrades to Fratton Park were made during the summer break of 1985. In the South Stand, these included adding additional fire escape staircases to the opposite ends of the mostly wooden South Stand and enclosing its distinctive Archibald Leitch "X" trusses as it contained wooden planks behind the metal framing. A stadium control room box was built onto the Boilermakers Hump terrace immediately in front of the north-east floodlight pylon tower too.

In the summer of 1988, new Portsmouth F.C. chairman Jim Gregory invested new money into the club, the South and North stands were both refurbished with new white exterior walls and azure blue metal roofs.  The condemned upper tier of the Fratton End was also demolished.

Following the 15 April 1989 Hillsborough Disaster, Portsmouth F.C. removed the perimeter fences from Fratton Park for the 1989–90 season, except at the Milton End to separate away supporters, although these too were removed for the following 1990–91 season after the Taylor Report was published in January 1990.

During the summer of 1996, the South Stand (and all other stands) became all seated, with new plastic seats replacing older wooden ones in the upper section. The South Stand's lower paddock terraces were reprofiled and seats were installed.

In 2007, under the new ownership of Russian-French-Israeli businessman Alexandre Gaydamak, the South Stand was controversially retrofitted with three additional rows of seats built immediately in front of the upper section of the stand, building over - and concealing - the original and distinctive Archibald Leitch 'X' trusses that were an eye-catching feature of the South Stand's original design. The additional 370 seats also narrowed the field of vision for supporters who sat beneath them in the lower South Stand. The extension and its three additional rows of seats became known as the "hanging basket".

Gaydamak also completely 'modernised' the Portsmouth FC boardroom within the South Stand. A set of fourteen antique oak chairs and a five-leaf table were literally thrown out into a rubbish skip during the renovations.  The chairs have the design of a ship's wheel on their backs and had dark navy-blue velvet upholstery. The chairs had originally been made for a wardroom on the Royal Navy's first iron-clad warship , which was built in the 1860s. They had been gifted by the Royal Navy to Portsmouth FC for more than 70 years. During the Second World War, the chairs were moved to a Solent fort, where Winston Churchill and Field Marshal Montgomery are said to have sat on them to plot the downfall of the Germans. An anonymous builder who had been working at Fratton Park for the 2006 renovations decided to 'rescue' them and stored them for safe keeping. The builder says he plans to give the chairs and table back to Portsmouth FC when the current owners had 'changed their taste'.

The South Stand also contains the player's dressing rooms which are accessed via a pitchside 'tunnel' midway along the South Stand at the 'halfway line' point of the pitch. At pitch level, the South Stand also has dedicated seating areas for both 'Home' and 'Away' football teams and their associated staff. Directly above in the upper South Stand is a 'directors box' area of seating specifically for Portsmouth FC officials and visiting guests.

At the rear of the upper South Stand seating area, behind the directors box, is an area reserved for journalists. Above, perched on top of the South Stand roof, is a small television camera gantry, only accessible via an 'exciting' sheer vertical ladder climb from within the upper South Stand seating area.

On 6 March 2019, Portsmouth Football Club revealed that improvements to the South Stand had begun with an estimated completion date scheduled before the start of the 2019–20 season. The work on the South Stand included new exterior cladding, a new roof, new guttering, new lighting (including emergency lighting) and replacing structural steelwork within the South Stand's structure.

On 21 May 2019, Portsmouth applied for planning permission to construct a new, larger camera gantry to the roof of the South Stand, along with eight sets of roof-mounted floodlight clusters. The new gantry was hoped to be in place for the 2020–21 season, although the work has been delayed due to ground safety commitments, including a refurbishment of the North Stand roof in 2020.

On 9 July 2019, a video released by Portsmouth's media department showed the first of ten sets of rooftop mounted floodlights being fitted to the new roof of the South Stand.

By Tuesday 6 August 2019, the work to improve the South Stand roof, cladding and rooftop floodlights were completed in time for Fratton Park's first competitive match for the 2019–20 season, the First Round of the League Cup against Birmingham City, an evening fixture in which Portsmouth won 3–0. This was the first evening game played without any light from Fratton Park's iconic four corner floodlight pylon towers since their erection in 1962.

Work to convert the South Stand into a single continuous tier began on 4 April 2022. The Lower South (previously a standing terrace paddock with seats added in 1996) was planned to be replaced with a continuation of the Upper South, fully covering it to pitch level. The Archibald Leitch "X" truss at the front of the upper tier was planned to have its outer cladding and advertisements removed, to be restored and bisect the new single tier South Stand.

On 3 May 2022, Portsmouth revealed that all of the South Stand seats and its three-row seat "hanging basket" extension had been removed. Portsmouth's chief executive Andrew Cullen revealed on 31 May 2022 that refurbishment and enhancement works would actually reduce the South Stand capacity by 450 seats, but this would be offset by a capacity increase in the North Stand.

The new lower tier of the South Stand has nine rows of seats, the surface is constructed from pre-fabricated sections of glass-reinforced plastic "seating cassettes" that are attached to a metal support framework beneath them, fixed directly to the existing Lower South terraces.  These legacy terraces were neither excavated or removed; there is a hollow void between new seats and the old terraces. The new home and away team "dugout" seating areas each have 21 seats and are incorporated within the new Lower South seating too. The South Stand's distinctive Archibald Leitch "X" truss was restored after being covered over for 37 years since 1985. However, the restored truss is not fully visible as the new lower tier seats partially obscures it.

However, as the new Lower South tier of seats were not part of Archibald Leitch's 1925 design or plan, the South Stand roof does not fully cover the new seats; meaning that Lower South Stand supporters will be exposed to rain. A new roof extension cannot be built, as this would have several negative effects, casting a shadow over the Fratton Park pitch, blocking the light from rooftop floodlights and also blocking the supporters view of the north side of the pitch to those sat in the Upper South tier.

The refurbished South Stand was reopened on Saturday 23 July 2022 for a friendly match versus Coventry City which the visitors won 0–2.

In 2023, a new television gantry is scheduled to be constructed into the South Stand roof, replacing the original gantry which can only be accessed via a vertical ladder.  The new gantry will be more easily accessible and feature decorative elements that include the Portsmouth Football Club crest.

The North Stand

Current capacity: 8,147 (all seated)

Originally opening to the south of Milton Lane on 15 August 1899, the uncovered North Terrace (as it was then called) had 'terracing which stretched for 240 feet' on the northern side of Fratton Park.

In 1905, a small roofed North Stand was built at the halfway line on the northern terrace touchline, flanked on either side by the remaining North Terrace. The stand was similar in appearance to the Grand Stand on the opposite south side of the pitch. The stand was widened during the next two decades and with the addition of an enlarged column-supported canopy covering the North Terrace by around 1930–31.

Using money from the June 1934 sale of defender Jimmy Allen and money from the 1934 FA Cup Final, Portsmouth F.C. announced at Christmas 1934 that the North Terrace was to be rebuilt with a much larger stand, increasing the overall ground capacity to more than 58,000, with 33,000 of those sheltered by a roof. The new North Stand was designed by famous Scottish architect Archibald Leitch, who had also designed Fratton Park's South Stand ten years earlier in 1925. The North Stand's construction was undertaken by Frank Bevis & Co.

 
On 7 September 1935 the new North Stand was opened by John McKenna, who had also opened Fratton Park's new South Stand ten years earlier.  The official opening ceremony took place over loudspeakers from the directors box of the South Stand just before kickoff of the game against visitors Aston Villa, ironically captained by former Portsmouth defender Jimmy Allen! The new "Jimmy Allen Stand" as it was unofficially nicknamed, contained a new roofed all-standing upper tier, while a rebuilt lower North Terrace was built over the site of the old North Stand site. This work restored the North Terrace back to its original full length of the Fratton Park pitch.

The North Stand was built with an irregular angled western end, as if built "straight" it would have overlapped the unparallel Milton Lane public footpath behind the stand. Instead of purchasing additional land to 'straighten' Milton Lane and to build a uniformly straight North Stand, Portsmouth FC instead chose to build the new North Stand within the existing Fratton Park footprint. This has resulted in the North Stand looking oddly angled and crooked at its western end since 1935.

Fratton Park's capacity was reduced from 58,000 to 52,000 for safety reasons after the Burnden Park disaster of 1946. In 1951, 4,226 seats were fitted onto the upper standing terrace tier of the North Stand. These seats were initially disliked by some of the stand's displaced supporters, blaming the North Stand's reduced standing capacity and also an increase in ticket price to the seated section. However, the revenue earned from the new seats was reinvested back into Fratton Park as in 1956, a new license was obtained to rebuild and increase the Fratton End to a standing capacity of 5000. The Lower North Terrace was kept all-standing, until 1996.

During 1983, when pitch invasions by supporters were commonplace, perimeter fences were built around the entire Fratton Park pitch.

In the summer of 1988, new Portsmouth F.C. chairman Jim Gregory invested new money into the club, the South and North stands were both refurbished with new white exterior walls and azure blue metal roofs.  The condemned upper tier of the Fratton End was also demolished.

Following the 15 April 1989 Hillsborough Disaster, Portsmouth F.C. removed the perimeter fences from Fratton Park for the 1989–90 season, except at the Milton End to separate away supporters, although these too were removed for the following 1990–91 season after the Taylor Report was published in January 1990.

During the summer of 1996, the North Stand (and all other stands) became all seated with modern blue plastic seats replacing the old wooden ones in the upper tier of North Stand. The Lower North Terrace of the North Stand was fitted with seats too, as part of the Taylor Report recommendations.

In the summer of 1997, a new North Stand roof extension was built to shelter the exposed lower North supporters from rain. At the same time, a new Fratton End stand was built, which first opened on 31 October 1997.

In 2015, a new shingle surfaced main car park for Portsmouth FC was laid and opened behind the North Stand. This additional land, formerly part of a neighbouring industrial estate, had been purchased by Portsmouth FC during the early 2000s. Most of the original 'Milton Lane' footpath has now been absorbed into the new car park, meaning that a newer 'Milton Lane' footpath has been built along the new car park's northern boundary.

On Saturday 17 December 2016, The Pompey Supporters Trust unveiled the 'Wall Of Fame' plaques to the rear wall of the North Stand, featuring the names of all the 2300 PST shareholders who helped save Portsmouth FC from liquidation by the High Court Of Justice on 10 April 2013.

On Monday 6 April 2020 - during the COVID-19 coronavirus lockdown - Portsmouth FC announced that 'substantial' and 'essential works' to the North Stand had begun, which would involve the replacement of the roof, external cladding and beams. The work was announced by Portsmouth as 'complete' on 3 September 2020, the roof of the North Stand and its 1997 Lower North extension, now have a uniform dark blue appearance and additional translucent roof panelling to allow natural sunlight into previously shadowed darker areas.

In June 2021, Portsmouth FC began a planned four year refurbishment of Fratton Park by removing and replacing the North Stand's seats, which were originally fitted in 1996.

In January 2022, 1200 seats in the western half (A to E sections) of the Lower North were removed. These supporters affected by seat removal were temporarily moved to other areas of Fratton Park. The concrete surface layer of the western half of the Lower North was then demolished and cleared, temporarily exposing the original 1899 North Terrace earthbank soil to the open air. This western Lower North section was reprofiled with a new surface concrete layer for a dedicated area for wheelchair users and their carers. The work on this western section was completed by May 2022.

Work to reprofile and replace seats to the remaining eastern half of the Lower North (F to K sections) commenced on 3 May 2022. These improvements increased North Stand capacity by a further 600 additional new seats and 12 wheelchair spaces.

The refurbished Lower North was reopened on Saturday 23 July 2022 for a friendly match versus Coventry City which the visitors won 0–2.

On 27 January 2023, Portsmouth CEO Andrew Cullen revealed at Portsmouth Guildhall's "Shaping Portsmouth Conference" that a further future redevelopment to enlarge the capacity of Fratton Park would potentially see the entire North Stand roof and upper tier being removed to allow the building of a new larger capacity upper tier (and roof) directly behind the existing North Stand's lower tier, which would be retained.

The Milton End

Current capacity: 3,196 (all seated)

At the eastern end of Fratton Park is the 'Milton End'. When Fratton Park first opened on 15 August 1899, no stands or terracing existed yet at the Milton and Fratton ends. Instead, a thousand supporters could sit in relative comfort in the roofed Grand Stand on the south side of the pitch, or stand on the banked open air North Terrace on the north side. Alternatively, supporters could also stand on flat open ground behind the two opposite goal lines at each 'end'.

In 1905, the sight lines for supporters at the east end of Fratton Park were improved by the construction of an open air solid earthbank terrace, covered with wooden plank steps over layers of cinders and compacted top soil.  The new east end terrace initially became known as the Spion Kop, a colloquial British nickname for an open air earthbank terrace that resembled Spion Kop hill near Ladysmith, South Africa, a 1900 battle location during the Second Boer War.  The Spion Kop was joined to the North Terrace's eastern end with a connecting corner terrace, known as 'The Milton Corner' which later became known as 'The Boilermakers Hump'.

In 1928 the Spion Kop (Milton End) was reprofiled with concrete terracing, bringing the capacity of Fratton Park up to 40,000.

During October 1948, repairs to the uneven broken rear gangway of the Spion Kop took place to make it safe, using brick rubble surfaced with a top layer of ashes. A new perimeter wall with a handrail was also built at the top of the stand to stop supporters falling from the top into the Specks Lane alleyway below. A new stairwell leading up from the northeast corner turnstiles behind the Boilermakers Hump, was built, with a shallower incline than its predecessor.

In 1949 the height of the Spion Kop was raised to the same level as the north-east corner (Milton Corner or Boilermakers Hump), with its terraces fully resurfaced with concrete. In 1974, Fratton Park became the first football stadium in England to dig "moats" between the pitch and the stands to prevent supporters invading the pitch. The "moats" were a recommendation by the then Minister of Sport and Recreation, Denis Howell.  The "moats" were deep trenches with thick concrete walls, dug behind both goals at the Milton End and Fratton End stands. The term "moat" is a little misleading, as they were not designed to be filled with water.

During 1983, when pitch invasions by supporters were commonplace, perimeter fences were built around the entire Fratton Park pitch.

On 12 March 1983, during Portsmouth's promotion chase to Division One, visiting rival Cardiff City fans - also chasing promotion - climbed the large scoreboard at the back of the Milton End terrace and stole the hands from the Milton End clock. Portsmouth eventually won the Division Two championship, with Cardiff City finishing as runners-up.

Following the 15 April 1989 Hillsborough Disaster, Portsmouth F.C. removed the perimeter fences from Fratton Park for the 1989–90 season, except at the Milton End to separate away supporters, although these too were removed for the following 1990–91 season after the Taylor Report was published in January 1990. However. the Milton End moat and wall have been retained to present day, with additional emergency exits retrofitted in.

In the summer of 1996, Fratton Park became an all-seater stadium. The Milton End terrace was reprofiled and blue plastic seats were installed.

During the late 20th and early 21st centuries, various television companies erected a series of temporary elevated miniature television studio boxes on scaffold pylons at the centre rear section of the Milton End where the scoreboard and stadium clock had previously been. This continued up until 2007 when the Milton End received a roof for the first time, which also prevented the continued use of temporary studio boxes on the Milton End.

In 2007, a roof was added over the Milton End following complaints to the Premier League by 'Away' supporters not accustomed to being exposed to rain. The Milton End, between the 2003-2004 and 2006–2007 seasons, was the Premier League's only unroofed stand. This unofficially earned the Milton End the nickname of "The Gene Kelly Stand" by soaked visitors, a reference to the 1952 "Singing in the Rain" musical and song.

During the summer break of 2018, a large video screen was installed to the roof line of the Milton End. The new screen was first used on Saturday 28 July 2018 in a pre-season friendly against Dutch team FC Utrecht, which resulted in a 1–1 draw.

Behind the stand is a public alleyway known as 'Specks Lane', which gives rear access to terraced houses in Alverstone Road, Milton. As the Milton End is a solid earth bank, there are no concourse facilities beneath the stand.

The club announced plans on Tuesday 14 January 2020 to submit a planning application to Portsmouth City Council for approval on a redevelopment of the Milton End stand and surrounding areas, referred to as "phase 1" of the Fratton Park Stadium Regeneration & Development Plan. The plans would provide an increased capacity in the stand, allow the stand to be safely sectioned to provide additional capacity to home fans where away ticket provisions are lower and provide increased disabled supporter seating, including for the first time providing away disabled supporter seating with their own fans. The Milton End redevelopment application was received by Portsmouth City Council on 5 March 2020, with consent granted on Wednesday 12 August 2020.

On 2 November 2022, Portsmouth F.C. announced that a third phase of Fratton Park refurbishment works had begun, in the Milton End, with photographs on social media revealing the Milton End's terraces partially cleared of their seats on its southern side. The refurbished Milton End capacity is planned to be increased to 3,200 seats, an upgrade of 400 additional seats and 32 wheelchair spaces.

The Fratton End

Current capacity: 4,700 (all seated)

At the west end of Fratton Park is the 'Fratton End', so-named as it is the nearest stand to Fratton railway station. In its early history, the west end stand was commonly known as The (Fratton) Railway End.

When Fratton Park first opened on 15 August 1899, no stands or terracing existed at the Fratton or Milton ends of the era. Instead, supporters could sit in relative comfort in the roofed Grand Stand on the south side pitch touchline, or stand on the open air North Terrace on the north side touchline. Alternatively, supporters could stand on flat open ground behind the two opposite goal lines.  The ends became known as the 'Railway End' (closest end to Fratton railway station) and the 'Milton End' (closest to Milton village).

In 1905, the sight lines for supporters at the Railway End were improved by the construction of an open air earthbank terrace, surfaced with wooden planked steps (every 15 inches) over a layer of cinders and a sub-layer of compressed top soil.

In 1915, during the First World War, the Railway End terrace was upgraded to accommodate 8,000 standing supporters and covered for the first time with a roof. There was no exterior back wall to the breezy Railway End stand, whose design allowed westerly coastal winds to channel through the stand and down across the pitch, which allowed the pitch to dry after wet weather.

On 14 April 1956, Portsmouth FC applied to Portsmouth City Council for planning permission to build a new Fratton End stand, with permission granted just six days later on 20 April 1956. The original Railway End was fully demolished after the final home match of the 1955–56 season. A new stand was then rapidly constructed in time for the first home game of the 1956–57 season, using an innovative new prefabricated concrete and steel method, one of the first of its kind. The new 'Fratton End' stand - as it was named - was opened by Sir Lesley Bowker, the vice-chairman of The Football Association on 25 August 1956 for the first home game against Sheffield Wednesday, which ended with a 3–1 home win. The new Fratton End was built with a roofed upper section and an open-air lower terrace, bisected by a concrete wall which ran across the full width of the new stand, with two large vomitories permitting access to the exterior ground level at the rear of the stand. After its opening, the new Fratton End stand extension was found and blamed for the poor quality of the Fratton Park pitch, as the new stand blocked the usual westerly winds that dried the pitch after rain. A solution was found by installing wind shutters onto the back of the Fratton End's back wall, which were left open on non-match days to allow the drying wind to pass through.

In 1974, Fratton Park became the first football stadium in England to dig deep "moat" trenches between the pitch and the stands to prevent supporters invading the pitch. The "moats" were a recommendation by the then Minister of Sport and Recreation, Denis Howell.  The "moats" were deep trenches with thick concrete walls, dug behind both goals at the Fratton End and Milton End stands. The term "moat" is a little misleading, as they were not designed to be filled with water.

During 1983, when pitch invasions by supporters were commonplace, perimeter fences were built around the entire Fratton Park pitch.

Only three decades after it opened, the upper tier of the Fratton End was structurally condemned in 1986 and partially closed for the Division Two season of 1986-87 and also for the club's return to Football League Division One (now 'Premier League') in the 1987–88 season, for the first time since their relegation in the 1958–59 season. This meant only the lower open-air terrace section could be used for the Fratton End fans, many of whom were displaced to other areas of Fratton Park. The upper roofed section of the Fratton End was subsequently demolished at the end of the 1987–88 season, with Portsmouth being relegated to Football League Division Two (now 'The Championship'). It had been found that the aggregate obtained from The Solent used in the 1956 concrete mix contained high levels of sea salt and had caused the upper Fratton End's steel structure to corrode and weaken.

In 1988, Portsmouth FC were granted planning permission by Portsmouth City Council on 6 October 1988 to build a replacement all-standing Fratton End with a capacity of 4500, designed by architect Michael Newberry. Plans and drawings indicated that the replacement stand would have closely resembled the size and design of the demolished 1956 stand, and retained Fratton Park's north-west corner terrace.  However, this 1988 stand design was not built as Portsmouth were relegated to Division Two.

Many fans theorise Portsmouth's 1988 relegation from the top flight was in part attributed to the partial closure of the Fratton End, in terms of decreased crowd atmosphere, lower attendances which affected financial earnings. The remaining lower terrace of the Fratton End continued to be used onwards from 1988 for a further nine years up until 1997, giving the Fratton End a much less impressive appearance and crowd volume than before.

Following the 15 April 1989 Hillsborough Disaster, Portsmouth F.C. removed the perimeter fences from Fratton Park for the 1989–90 season, except at the Milton End to separate away supporters, although these too were removed for the following 1990–91 season after the Taylor Report was published in January 1990.

On 14 January 1991, a second new design for a replacement Fratton End was granted a conditional five-year planning permission, which also required the removal of both floodlight towers at the Fratton End. Architect and planning drawings of the 1991 design showed a tall, all-seated, three-tier stand, with a glass-enclosed middle tier reserved for corporate hospitality boxes. This new Fratton End design with its extended corner wings, would have been the first of a four-phase stand replacement plan which would have completely rebuilt Fratton Park into a modern all-seated enclosed bowl shaped stadium. This 1991 design and its further three phases were not built.

On 5 May 1995, a third new plan for a replacement Fratton End was granted permission. The Mowlem design would have been more modest than its ambitious 1991 predecessor, with a single-tier all-seated stand, with a row of eighteen corporate hospitality boxes situated along the top and back, each holding up to ten people. Plans showed that the Fratton End's two existing corner floodlight towers would have been removed and replaced with two large lighting towers built directly onto the top of a cantilever-truss Fratton End roof. The plan was not built.

On 4 April 1996, a fourth plan designed by architects KSS Sports & Leisure Design Ltd for a new Fratton End replacement was granted planning permission by Portsmouth City Council. Similar to the previous design, the 1996 design would have been a single tier all-seated stand with sixteen corporate hospitality boxes at the top. Again, both of the Fratton End's floodlight towers would have been removed, but replaced with free-standing modern replacements at either side. This 1996 design - yet again - was not built.

In the summer of 1996, the lower terrace remnant of the Fratton End (and all other stands) was fitted with modern blue plastic seats, making Fratton Park an all seated stadium.

On 8 July 1997, planning permission was granted for the fifth time in nine years for a Fratton End replacement plan. However this time, work actually began on constructing a new Fratton End replacement stand, under the new ownership of club chairman Terry Venables. The architects of the new Fratton End were KSS Sports & Leisure Design Ltd (the same architects as the 1996 design), along with builders, TRY Build Limited.

The summer of 1997 saw the final demolition of the remaining 1956 Fratton End's lower terrace, ironically which had only just had plastic seats installed in 1996. After the site was cleared, TRY Build Ltd began immediate construction on the new single-tier, 4,500 seat, all-seated Fratton End stand - a simpler (and cheaper) design without any corporate boxes and no replacement of the existing floodlight towers. The new Fratton End was much larger than the previous 1956 stand and claimed two metres of Fratton Park's pitch length which caused the halfway line to shift slightly to the east of the player's tunnel, which had always traditionally been exactly on the halfway line. The new Fratton End's larger size also claimed the land previously occupied by the previous Fratton End's "moat", which was filled in.  At the same time as the Fratton End was constructed, a new roof extension was built over the uncovered lower tier of the North Stand.  The orientation angle of new Fratton End was also slightly re-aligned to match Archibald Leitch's North Stand and South Stand orientation at perfect right angles.

The low and early autumn and winter sunsets behind the new larger, taller Fratton End stand at the western end of the stadium caused a long dark shadow to be cast across the Fratton Park pitch. Additional floodlights had been designed into the rooftop of the new Fratton End stand to counteract negative effects of dark shadows.

With the Fratton End construction complete, the new £2.2 million Fratton End was cleared for its first "official" opening - without ceremony - on Friday 31 October 1997 at 4.59pm - with one minute to spare before a 5pm opening clearance deadline. Problems with some misoriented Fratton End rooftop floodlights had caused the Fratton End of the pitch to be "shrouded in gloom on Hallowe'en", according to the Sky Sports 3 TV commentator, causing some doubt that the live evening televised Division One game against Swindon Town would take place. Fortunately, the match referee, Paul Danson gave the go-ahead for the evening fixture. Unfortunately, the game was won 0-1 by Swindon Town with an official Fratton Park attendance of only 8,707.

Initially, the new Fratton End was officially known as 'The KJC Stand' under a sponsorship agreement with the mobile telephone retailer KJC Mobile Phones Limited (now dissolved). As a mark of respect to the club's most famous former player and manager, a large portrait of Jimmy Dickinson was designed into the seating plan of the new Fratton End stand on its southern wing, with the club's famous crest on the northern wing. The Fratton End is the tallest stand in Fratton Park and has a maximum capacity of 4,700 seats. During construction of the new Fratton End, the connecting north-west corner quadrant stand (similar to 'The Boilermakers Hump') which connected the old Fratton End to the lower terrace of North Stand was also demolished. This provided a new large open space "gap" for vehicles to access the Fratton Park pitch as well as a wider exit route for fans.

The Fratton End later received a formal opening ceremony in Portsmouth F.C.'s 100th Anniversary Year celebrations in a League Division One match against Birmingham City on Saturday 4 April 1998 - one day before the official 100-year club anniversary on Sunday 5 April 1998.  The match ended 1–1 with an attendance of 14,591 supporters. The Fratton End stand had actually already been opened - without ceremony - on 31 October 1997 earlier in that 1997–98 season.

Between 2002 and 2005, the Fratton End was commercially branded as "The Ty Europe Stand" under a shirt sponsorship agreement with the Ty Europe division of Ty Inc., the manufacturer of "Beanie Babies" soft toys.
 
Strangely, a large analogue clock which was originally installed and hung beneath the Fratton End roof in 1997, broke during the mid-2000s and was removed 'for repair'. The clock has never been seen since. Rumours persist that a Havant based clock repair company was not paid and have kept the clock until payment is received.

On the rear of the Fratton End hangs a pub sign which reads 'The Pompey', and depicts an imagine of football player wearing blue and white Portsmouth home kit from the 1972–73 season. This pub sign originally hung from the former Brickwood Brewery public house called 'The Pompey', designed by Arthur Edward Cogswell in 1900. The former pub on the corner of Frogmore Road and Carisbrooke Road was closed on 19 August 1988 and purchased by Portsmouth F.C. to be used as premises for a club shop, a ticket office and a media centre. The pub sign was removed and fitted to the rear of the Fratton End stand above the entrance to the Fratton End's own bar.

The Fratton End is known today for housing the most vocal of Portsmouth FC's home supporters and are arguably, 'the loudest in the land' according to some television commentators. However, this was not always so as before the 1960s, the loudest supporters were to be found at the centreline areas of the North Stand's lower terrace and eastwards along to the Boilermaker's Hump. During the 1960s, a new wave of younger "baby boomer" Pompey supporters claimed the Fratton End as their own area, which with decades and later generations has since become the loudest area of Fratton Park.

'The Boilermakers Hump' (or 'Milton Corner')
'The Boilermakers Hump' was the twentieth century nickname given to the north-east corner terrace of Fratton Park, located between the North Terrace and Milton End. It is likely that the corner terrace was built as part of upgrades to Fratton Park in 1905, which joined the North Terrace to the newly built Milton End terrace. The corner was also known as the 'Milton Corner'.

The 'Boilermakers Hump' name originates from men who worked in Portsmouth dockyard who specialised in building and maintaining the steam boilers for the Royal Navy fleet. The Boilermakers met at the north-east corner of Fratton Park on match days, the corner became nicknamed 'The Boilermakers Hump', because the tall curved corner terrace was taller than the Milton End and North Terrace stands and had a hump-like appearance.

The Boilermakers had a rowdy reputation. They worked hard and played hard. In an era before floodlit evening matches, the Boilermakers would often sneak out of work early for midweek afternoon matches, leaving work unwashed, dirty and drunk. Because of this reputation, people would steer clear of them, allowing the Boilermakers to claim their own area in Fratton Park for themselves - on the Hump.

The 'Hump' lost its distinctive height difference when the Milton End was reprofiled up to the same height as The Hump in 1949.

In 1962, floodlight pylon towers were constructed in the four corners of Fratton Park, replacing the original roof-top sets installed in 1956. The north-east tower was built in the north-east corner of Fratton Park at top of the Boilermakers Hump.

Following the 11 May 1985 Bradford City stadium fire, a stadium control room box was built onto the Boilermakers Hump terrace immediately in front of the north-east floodlight pylon tower during the summer break of 1985. Other such safety upgrades to Fratton Park included adding additional fire escape staircases to the opposite ends of the mostly wooden South Stand and enclosing its distinctive Archibald Leitch "X" trusses as it contained wooden planks behind the metal framing.

In 1996, blue plastic seats were fixed onto the remaining Boilermakers Hump terrace, as part of the overall plan to make Fratton Park an all-seater stadium to meet Taylor Report standards.

Presently, the Boilermakers Hump is the closest point in Fratton Park between home fans in the North Stand and the visiting 'away' fans in the Milton End stand. 'The Boilermakers Hump' is now mostly occupied by a police and security control room box, and was the former location of the north-east floodlight pylon tower until it was removed on 4 September 2019. Seats installed in 1996 were removed from the north-east corner area between 2016 and 2017 to provide a separation zone between the opposing sets of supporters.

Plans to redevelop the Boilermakers Hump as part of the Fratton Park "Phase 1" Milton End refurbishment were revealed in 2020 by Portsmouth FC and Portsmouth City Council. The Boilermakers Hump is planned to be reprofiled with new seating, incorporating wheelchair user spaces on the uppermost level accessed from ground level via a new lift. Behind the wheelchair spaces, a new stadium control room, refreshment kiosks and toilet facilities will be built. The Boilermakers Hump will then become covered by a roof extension from the existing Milton End roof.

Other structures

"The Pompey"

In 1900, a year after his earlier work in constructing the early Fratton Park, Portsmouth architect Arthur Cogswell returned and built a Brickwoods Brewery pub for Portsmouth's first chairman, John Brickwood, at 44 Frogmore Road - literally "next-door" to Fratton Park stadium. The new pub was named The Pompey. Arthur Cogswell was well known to John Brickwood, as Cogswell had built many other Brickwoods Brewery pubs around the Portsmouth area. Arthur Cogswell was also an enthusiast of association football, having formed an earlier amateur level Portsmouth Association Football Club (1884 to 1896).

The Pompey was closed down in 1988, but the premises were purchased by Portsmouth F.C., who then converted the building into a club souvenir and merchandise shop. Since 1988, the former pub has had various roles, as the club's media centre, for hospitality and most recently as the club's ticket office. The Pompey'''s hanging pub sign, which displays an image of a Portsmouth footballer in 1972–73 season kit, was later relocated and is currently hung on the rear wall of The Fratton End stand.The Pompey , built in 1900, is currently the oldest surviving building at Fratton Park, although was not built as part of the original 1899 era stadium.

On Tuesday 26 May 2020, Portsmouth announced that the exterior of  'The Pompey'  building was to be (eventually) restored back to its public house configuration by removing exterior branding to reveal the original Brickwoods Brewery mosaic tiling. Shortly afterwards, on Wednesday 3 June 2020, photographs appeared on social media which showed the branding being removed, to reveal the Brickwoods Brewery tiles again after being covered over for at least thirty years.

The Fratton Park Pavilion
In 1905, a club pavilion was donated to the club by its first chairman John Brickwood and built at the south-west corner of Fratton Park in Frogmore Road by Arthur Cogswell, who had also designed the Brickwoods Brewery public house The Pompey five years earlier. The Fratton Park pavilion was built in the same mock Tudor style as those found in other late 19th century football grounds, such as Fulham F.C.'s Craven Cottage. Fratton Park's pavilion was built immediately to the north of The Pompey pub which Cogswell had built in 1900.  The north-eastern side of the pavilion featured a tall octagonal clock tower spire featuring a covered spectator gallery beneath it and around the northern side of the pavilion. The pavilion also housed the players dressing rooms and the club offices.

However, the pavilion's clock tower spire was removed in 1925 to allow space for the construction of the current South Stand, which partially covers the pavilion. The South Stand was designed by the acclaimed Scottish architect, Archibald Leitch. The pavilion's mock Tudor facade has since been painted since the mid-1970s white with black timber frames, but older monochrome photographs clearly show that the pavilion originally had darker walls (possibly beige or cream?) and much lighter coloured (white?) timber frames, as recently as the early 1970s, but was later repainted to match the black and white paintwork scheme of The Pompey pub. This repainting may have been authorised during the ownership of former Portsmouth chairman John Deacon, along with the enclosure of the pavilions' distinctive "1898" motif and surrounding detail within a plain white box structure, which on its front face were "PFC" initial letters (in a blue 3D plastic italicised font) attached to it, which lasted into the 1980s.

Floodlights

Portsmouth FC was the first English football club to stage a Football League match under floodlights, in a 22 February 1956 game against Newcastle United. These original floodlights were positioned at opposite ends on top of the South Stand and North Stand roofs.

On 5 October 1961, planning permission was granted to Portsmouth FC to construct four new floodlight tower pylons in the four corners of Fratton Park, replacing the original 1956 roof-top sets which were removed after the four new towers were constructed in 1962. The Portsmouth Supporters Club contributed £12,000 (approx £254,000 in 2018) to the new pylon towers.

In 1997, a five-year planning permission was granted to Portsmouth FC by the city council's planning department to remove and replace Fratton Park's four 1962 era corner floodlight lamp towers with a set of modern replacements, to be supplied by Abacus Lighting Limited, although this work was not undertaken following the late-nineties ownership of Terry Venables and Martin Gregory and the subsequent financial crisis that saw the club go into administration in 1999.

In July 2015, work began by Musco Lighting to bring pitch illumination up to Championship standards for evening games at Fratton Park. The work was completed in September 2015. The new lamps were installed along the roof edges of the Fratton End, North Stand and Milton End stands of Fratton Park. This new lighting rendered the two northern corner floodlight towers obsolete and they were permanently switched off, with the illumination lamps removed from the north-east tower. At the time, there were no plans to remove the iconic 1962 pylon towers. During initial surveying work, it was discovered that the South Stand roof was not capable of supporting the new lighting equipment, so the decision was taken to keep the two southern corner floodlight towers operational.

The pylons on the northern side of the ground were deactivated and removed during 2019. In April 2019, the club released a statement seeking planning permission to relocate the inactive north-west pylon to the north east perimeter of the car park behind the North Stand.

On the evening of Thursday 16 May 2019, after the second leg of the EFL League One playoff semi final vs Sunderland, Fratton Park's two southern side floodlight pylons were permanently switched off. New roof top floodlight lamps were proposed to replace them, to be fitted along the top of a newly refurbished South Stand in time for 2019–20 season. The relocated north-west pylon was planned to have its lamps removed and serve as a historic local landmark and as a telecommunications tower.

On Tuesday 17 June 2019, the first of Fratton Park's four floodlight pylons was removed with a hydraulic crane, which lifted the north-west pylon down in four sections to the ground. It was later reassembled in the North Stand car park to serve as both a legacy memorial to the four long-serving towers and also to continue their secondary role as telecommunication masts. The removal of the pylon was done by Portsmouth-based demolition company Hughes & Salvidge, who had famously completed demolition work on Southampton's previous home ground, The Dell on Friday 13 July 2001.

On 9 July 2019, a video was released by Portsmouth's media department showing the first of ten sets of rooftop mounted floodlights being fitted to the new roof of the South Stand. On 15 July 2019, the north-west pylon tower was re-erected in its new permanent home in the North Stand car park.

On Tuesday 6 August 2019, the new South Stand rooftop floodlights were first used in an evening competitive match during the First Round of the League Cup against Birmingham City, which Portsmouth won 3–0. This was the first evening game played in 57 years without any light from Fratton Park's iconic four corner floodlight pylon towers since their erection in 1962.

A second floodlight pylon was removed from the north-east "Boilermaker's Hump" corner on Wednesday 4 September 2019, followed by a third pylon removal in the south-west Frogmore Road corner on 5 September 2019. The fourth floodlight tower in the south-east corner was finally removed on Friday 20 November 2020.

The Pompey Shop

Earliest incarnations of the Pompey Shop have been located at:
 The Pompey Shop, at 42 Frogmore Road, Milton up until 1988, when it was moved into The Pompey pub, which the club bought.
 The Pompey Shop, premises inside the former The Pompey pub at 44 Frogmore Road, Milton, Portsmouth. (1988-1999).
 Pompey Sport, located beneath the northern end of the Fratton End stand of Fratton Park (1999-2007). (closed, since used as The Chimes Lounge and currently as The Legends Lounge)

After reaching the Premier League, Portsmouth FC operated three stores:
 Portsmouth FC Megastore, Rodney Road, Milton, Portsmouth. Opened in July 2007 by Harry Redknapp. (July 2007 - 2011) (closed, since converted into a commercial gym)
 A second Portsmouth FC store was initially located in the city centre at 48 Cascades (Kingswell Path) inside Cascades Shopping Centre in Landport, Portsmouth in the early 2000s, before relocating nearby to 30 Cascades, Cascades Shopping Centre. The store closed 5 February 2013.
 A third Portsmouth FC store was located at Unit 88, 46 Westbury Square, within Fareham Shopping Centre, Fareham, Hampshire during 2008 and 2009. (since closed)

Portsmouth's relegation from the Premier League and financial administration caused the downsizing of retail operations to a single store located at:
 Pompey Store, 42 Frogmore Road, Milton, Portsmouth (9 April 2011 - 10 August 2011) a small store in a former Portsmouth FC owned office/community team property, located on the corner of Frogmore Road and Carisbrooke Road. 42 Frogmore Road has since been restored back to a private house.
 Pompey Megastore was located at The Pompey Centre, Goldsmith Avenue, Milton, Portsmouth (11 August 2011 - 5 February 2013).

Portsmouth, under new PST ownership, reopened a retail store with new management in 2013 in the same premises as the former Pompey Megastore.
 Pompey Store.com, The Pompey Centre, Goldsmith Avenue, Milton, Portsmouth, ran by Sports Direct (10 October 2013 - 20 June 2018).

Portsmouth FC were purchased by The Tornante Company on 3 August 2017:
 On 21 June 2018, a new club shop named The Pompey Shop was opened at 16 Anson Road, Milton, Portsmouth, ran by Just Sport group (Football Retail Partners to Nike the official Kit Supplier), - just behind Fratton Park's North Stand and car park. The opening day was attended by Portsmouth players Ben Close, Adam May, Jamal Lowe and Brandon Haunstrup.

"Offside Cottage"Offside Cottage, was a terraced house formerly next door to Fratton Park at number 57 Frogmore Road. The house was owned by Portsmouth FC and was used as the offices of the Portsmouth Supporters Club.  Offside Cottage was demolished in 1966 to make way for new Portsmouth Football Club offices, a supporters lounge and new turnstiles for the Fratton End. The new offices were officially opened on 27 March 1967, an Easter Monday. The demolition of 57 Frogmore Road also permitted a new rear access alleyway between 55 Frogmore Road and the new office building.  The alleyway is now used as very narrow public pathway between Frogmore Road and Fratton Park's Victory South Gate in McLoughlin Way.

Milton Lane Gymnasium
On Friday 1 October 1954, Portsmouth FC were granted permission by the city's council to build a player's gymnasium. The gym was built close to Fratton Park's north-west corner on the southern side of a T-junction between the original Milton Lane and Anson Road. A two-storey extension to the gymnasium was granted on 15 November 1978. The gymnasium survived up until it was cleared for the demolition and redevelopment of Fratton railway goods yard - a project known as The Pompey Centre - in the early 2000s. The gymnasium's former location is now occupied by a ground level car park and an upper-level loading bay both belonging to a large Tesco Extra superstore, which was opened in November 2015. The route of the original Milton Lane pathway has also been diverted further to the north to allow for the North Stand car park and also for a new petrol station attached to the Tesco store.

Other history
Fratton Park has hosted one full England international match on 2 March 1903 against Wales and has also hosted some England U-21 internationals.

On 6 June 1918, an American army team played a Canadian army team in a baseball match at Fratton Park, with the gate money donated to the British Red Cross. The US army team won 4–3.

Southampton F.C. were briefly forced to switch home matches to Fratton Park during World War II when a German Luftwaffe bomb was dropped and hit their home at The Dell, Southampton in November 1940, leaving an 18-foot wide crater on the pitch which damaged an underground water culvert, flooding the pitch.

On 26 July 1948, Fratton Park hosted a Netherlands vs Ireland first-round football game in the 1948 London Olympics, one of only two grounds outside London to host matches in the Olympic football tournament.  The game at Fratton Park was attended by a crowd of 8,000, with a 3–1 win to the Netherlands. 

In 1989, one of Portsmouth's crossbars was found to be one inch too low by a match referee and was readjusted to ensure fair play.

For 72 years between 1925 and 1997, the Fratton Park football pitch was not a perfect rectangle, but instead, a parallelogram. Then for 18 years between 1997 and 2015, the pitch shape was trapezoidal before a perfect rectanglular shaped one was recreated in 2015 after the Fratton Park pitch was relaid.
 
On 16 July 2012, Fratton Park acted as the start location of Day 59 of the seventy day long London 2012 Olympic Torch Relay. The Day 59 relay route began with veteran Portsmouth F.C. steward John Jenkins as runner number 001, who then carried the Olympic flame onto and around the Fratton Park pitch. The Day 59 route was Portsmouth to Brighton & Hove.

 Records 
Crowd Attendance Record
Fratton Park's crowd attendance record is 51,385 for an FA Cup quarter-final match against Derby County on 26 February 1949, in which Portsmouth won 2–1. The capacity has in recent years been greatly reduced from its maximum standing capacity of 58,000 by the introduction of compulsory seating rules recommended by The Taylor Report.

Largest Fratton Park Home Win
On 9 April 1927, Portsmouth beat Notts County a record 9–1 in the successful 1926-27 Football League Division Two season.

Largest Fratton Park Home Defeats
By largest margin:
 On 16 January 1937, Portsmouth lost 0–5 to Tottenham Hotspur in Round Three of the FA Cup.
 On 15 October 1955, Portsmouth lost 0–5 to Birmingham City in a Football League Division One game in the 1955–56 season.
 On 24 March 2010, Portsmouth lost 0–5 to Chelsea F.C. in the FA Premier League.

By greatest number of goals conceded:
 On 17 September 1958, Portsmouth lost 2–6 to West Bromwich Albion in Football League Division One in the 1958–59 season.

Largest quantity of Fratton Park Goals
By highest aggregate score:
 11 goals - On 29 September 2007, Portsmouth defeated Reading F.C. 7–4 in the FA Premier League; this match is notable as the highest scoring match in Premier League history.

Proposed relocations

Portsmouth Airport, Hilsea
Portsmouth Airport was a grass field aerodrome formerly located in the north-east corner of Portsea Island that opened in 1932 and closed in December 1973 due to a series of aircraft accidents. Earlier in 1967, Goldsmith Avenue (to the south of Fratton Park) was planned to become part of a major new "M276" motorway route through Portsea Island by Hampshire County Council, with Portsmouth City Council offering the former airport land for Portsmouth F.C. to relocate to.

However, Hampshire County Council's over-ambitious and hugely disruptive road plans were dropped in 1976 and Portsmouth F.C. chose not to relocate away from their traditional Fratton Park home. In the late 1980s, a fifty-acre Wilson Homes housing development known as Anchorage Park was built on the former airport site instead.

Farlington (Parkway Stadium)
Farlington, at the north of Langstone Harbour, is an area of land that was partly developed as a horse racecourse in 1891.  The Portsmouth Park racecourse was closed in 1914 at the outbreak of the First World War and turned into an ammunition dump. After the war, the former Portsmouth Park'' racecourse land was bought in 1929 by Portsmouth's borough council and partly redeveloped into houses expanding the villages of Farlington and Drayton. The southern section of the former racecourse is a marsh and was partly drained and retained as school sports playing fields. The remaining marsh then became a nature reserve known as Farlington Marshes.

Portsmouth's plans to build a 24,000 seat Parkway Stadium on the playing fields at Farlington were revealed in 1993 and would include the reopening of the Farlington Halt railway station (as "Farlington Parkway"), which used to serve the former racecourse. Parkway Stadium was planned to have been of a design very similar to Huddersfield Town's current stadium. However, local protestors and environmentalists objected to the plans citing traffic, environmental and wildlife concerns, particularly for migrating Brent Geese that inhabited the marshes. The Parkway Stadium plans were ultimately rejected by the Secretary of State in December 1994.

Fratton Goods Yard, Milton
At the end of the 2003–04 season in the Premier League, plans were announced to build a new stadium on the site of an adjacent disused rail-freight depot, known as Fratton Goods Yard. These plans, which were supported by the city council, would have allowed a much needed increase in ground capacity, as it was claimed that an increase would be impossible to achieve on the current Fratton Park footprint because of the close proximity of residential housing, particularly in Alverstone Road and Carisbrooke Road in Milton.

However, before work could begin, the plans were superseded by a newer proposal to redevelop the existing Fratton Park site by rotating the pitch 90 degrees to accommodate a larger capacity stadium, funded in part by a "Pompey Village" residential, hotel and retail project on the adjacent Fratton Goods Yard site. Work on the stadium was due to commence in the summer of 2006, but no residential or stadium construction phases ever began. However, the first retail and hotel phase of the redevelopment was completed a year later in 2007, opening as "The Pompey Centre".

The Hard, Portsea
After plans for the Pompey Village and Fratton Park rotation project were dropped, another proposal was announced on 25 April 2007 that envisaged a 36,000-seat stadium built over The Hard in Portsea, between Portsmouth Naval Base and Portsmouth Harbour railway station. These plans were ambitious and included creating a leisure village around the stadium, complete with 1,500 waterfront apartments as well as restaurants and other facilities.

The proposal for a new stadium was widely supported, although cautiously by many that were conscious that the waterfront location proposed in the outline plans would be surrounded on three sides, by the naval base, harbour itself and railway, thus leaving only one end for access by residents and supporters. Critics also pointed out that the Hard and mudflats which the stadium was proposed to sit on was close to an area of Site of Special Scientific Interest, would be difficult to get to by road and had nowhere near the amount of car parking facilities needed for such an enterprise (Portsmouth is an island, with road access by only three routes from the north, and the waterfront site was close to the south-west extremity of the island).

These plans were also dropped before work could begin. The club had undertaken consultation and there were a number of objectors to the proposal, not least about the problems that 36,000 fans would cause to the local travel infrastructure. The Royal Navy also said that the proposal would cause problems with the proposed introduction of its new aircraft carriers as the position of the stadium would interfere with Portsmouth Harbour's main deep water channel. The stadium would have also caused the Victorian museum ship HMS Warrior to have been relocated.

Horsea Island
In 2008, a set of plans were approved, to build a new 35,000 capacity stadium and leisure/residential complex on Horsea Island, situated at the north of Portsmouth Harbour close to Port Solent marina. In 2009 the Horsea Island development was put on hold due to financial issues. The previous proposal to rotate the existing pitch at Fratton Park by 90 degrees was re-instated. Work was due to begin late 2009, with a gradual increase in capacity until completion in 2010 ending with a capacity of 30,000. No such pitch rotation was undertaken.

Future developments
The ground has been home to the club throughout its entire history. The old stadium has been refurbished and repaired, but the current facilities are showing signs of age. By the time Portsmouth reached the FA Premier League in 2003, other clubs at this level had either built new stadiums or significantly redeveloped existing facilities along modern, less working-class lines, abolishing traditional features which have so far been preserved at Fratton Park, despite relocation being suggested as long ago as the early 1990s. When the Taylor Report of January 1990 required all clubs in the top two divisions to have all-seater stadiums by the 1994-95 season, relocation was soon being considered by the Portsmouth board, although Fratton Park was still converted into an all-seater stadium over the next few years, giving it a capacity of over 19,000.

In 2011, plans to spend money redeveloping Fratton Park were announced, with improvements to changing rooms and toilets. By 2015, however, with Portsmouth in League Two (fourth tier of English football), no redevelopment or expansion work had yet taken place. As it stands, Fratton Park's current capacity would appear adequate until promotion to a higher division is achieved.

In 2015, two floodlight pylons were rendered obsolete due to corrosion and leaking water in the control boxes causing short-circuiting. Musco Lighting handled the installation of new lighting in the stadium over the course of three months. However, a report indicated that the South Stand was not capable of taking on the lights. For the time being the decision has been made to keep the south pylons active.

On Friday 19 October 2018, Portsmouth's new chairman, Michael Eisner published a photograph on social media of behind the scenes work and plans that hinted towards a future redevelopment of Fratton Park.

The club announced plans on Tuesday 14 January 2020 to submit a planning application to Portsmouth City Council for approval on a redevelopment of the Milton End stand and surrounding areas, referred to as "phase 1" of the Fratton Park Stadium Regeneration & Development Plan. The plans would provide an increased capacity in the stand, allow the stand to be safely sectioned to provide additional capacity to home fans where away ticket provisions are lower and provide increased disabled supporter seating, including for the first time providing away disabled supporter seating with their own fans.

On Monday 14 June 2021, Portsmouth announced a four-year long upgrade of Fratton Park that would see the ground rise above a capacity of 20,000 seats. On 15 June 2021, photographs of Fratton Park's 25 year-old seats being removed were revealed on the club's official social media websites. On 16 June 2021, Portsmouth announced acquiring the freehold to their current Roko training ground site and additional land.

Between January and August 2022, work to refurbish and reprofile the North and South stands took place and when completed restored Fratton Park's capacity to approximately 20,000. Work to refurbish and restore the 3,200 capacity to the Milton End began on 2 November 2022.

Details

Records
Overall Record Attendance: 51,385 v Derby County 26 February 1949, FA Cup Sixth Round 1948–1949 season.

All Seated Record Attendance: 20,821 v Tottenham Hotspur 17 October 2009, Premier League 2009–2010 season.

Average attendances since World War II

See also
List of English football stadiums by capacity
Ground improvements at English football Stadia

References

Bibliography

External links

Stadium plans

Portsmouth F.C.
Sport in Portsmouth
Football venues in England
Premier League venues
Tourist attractions in Portsmouth
Buildings and structures in Portsmouth
Sports venues in Hampshire
Sports venues completed in 1899
English Football League venues
Portsmouth